Asian Dominican may refer to:

Ethnic Chinese in the Dominican Republic
Japanese settlement in the Dominican Republic